Wilton Barnhardt (born 1960) is a former reporter for Sports Illustrated and is the author of Emma Who Saved My Life (1989), Gospel (1993), Show World (1999), and Lookaway, Lookaway (2013).

Barnhardt took his B.A. at Michigan State University, and was a graduate student at Brasenose College, University of Oxford, where he read for an M.Phil. in English. He teaches fiction-writing to undergraduate and graduate students at the North Carolina State University in Raleigh, where he is a faculty member in the Master of Fine Arts program in Creative Writing.

Bibliography
 Emma Who Saved My Life St. Martin's Press, 1989
 Gospel St. Martin's Press, 1993
 Show World: A Novel St. Martin's Press, 1999
 Lookaway, Lookaway St. Martin's Press, 2013

References

External links
 

1960 births
Michigan State University alumni
Alumni of Brasenose College, Oxford
20th-century American novelists
20th-century American male writers
Living people
Novelists from North Carolina
American magazine journalists
North Carolina State University faculty
American male novelists
20th-century American non-fiction writers
American male non-fiction writers